Augustine Kandathil (25 August 1874 – 10 January 1956) was Metropolitan and head of the Syro-Malabar Church (1923-1956).

Further reading
George Thalian: , Bp. Louis Memorial Press, 1961.
Abp. Augustine Kandathil:   on the Poem Shreeyeshu vijayam by Kattakayam Cherian Mappillai, 1926.

1874 births
1956 deaths
Malayali people
Christian clergy from Kottayam
Syro-Malabar Catholic Archbishops of Ernakulam-Angamaly
20th-century Roman Catholic archbishops in India
Founders of Catholic religious communities
Founders of Indian schools and colleges
University and college founders
Indian publishers (people)
Indian newspaper founders
Founders of orphanages
People of the Kingdom of Travancore
20th-century Indian educational theorists